Forget America is a 2000 German drama film directed by .

Cast 
 Marek Harloff - David Ludoff
  - Benno
 Franziska Petri - Anna Lindner

References

External links 

2000 drama films
2000 films
German drama films
2000s German films